Dorrigo National Park is a national park in New South Wales, Australia,  north of Sydney on Dome Road off the Waterfall Way,  east of the town of Dorrigo.

History

The park is part of the New England Group of the World Heritage Site Gondwana Rainforests of Australia inscribed in 1986 and added to the Australian National Heritage List in 2007. The area protected by the park is recognised for its exceptional natural beauty with significant habitats of outstanding value to science and conservation.

Geography
The park sits on a plateau, and thus, the large number of waterfalls in the area. Parts of the park are more mountainous, more towards the north, with the south only being so slightly hilly.

Highlights

The Rainforest Centre is a major CERRA interpretation centre. The interactive display, The Rainforest Revealed, explains how the rainforest evolved and gives insights into the animal and plant species that live there.

Several tracks in the park allow hikers to view the park's waterfalls and vistas to the coastal plain. A notable feature of the park is the Skywalk, an elevated walkway through and above the treetops, providing birdwatchers with an excellent view of local bird life.

Gallery

See also
 Protected areas of New South Wales

References

External links

 

National parks of New South Wales
Protected areas established in 1967
Gondwana Rainforests of Australia
1967 establishments in Australia